The Zec Lavigne is a "zone d'exploitation contrôlée" (Controlled harvesting zone) (ZEC) located at north of Saint-Côme, in administrative region of Lanaudière, in Quebec, in Canada.

Geography

Zec Lavigne is bordered on the west by the Mont-Tremblant National Park.

See also 
 Lanaudière, administrative region
 Saint-Côme, municipality
 Mont-Tremblant National Park, neighbour of the zec
 Zone d'exploitation contrôlée (controlled harvesting zone) (ZEC)

Protected areas of Lanaudière
Protected areas established in 1978